L'âge de la traduction. "La tâche du traducteur" de Walter Benjamin, un commentaire is a book by Antoine Berman, compiled by his widow Isabelle and published in 2008.

References

2008 non-fiction books
Contemporary philosophical literature
Translation studies
Translation publications
French-language books
Walter Benjamin